Rashid Khan (born 15 December 1959) is a former Pakistani cricketer who played in four Test matches and 29 One Day Internationals between 1980 and 1985. In 2006 he became the coach of the Chinese cricket team.

References

1959 births
Living people
Cricketers from Karachi
Pakistan Test cricketers
Pakistan One Day International cricketers
Cricketers at the 1983 Cricket World Cup
Pakistani cricketers
Public Works Department cricketers
Karachi Blues cricketers
Pakistan International Airlines cricketers
Sind A cricketers
Pakistan International Airlines B cricketers
Karachi Whites cricketers
Karachi cricketers
Pakistani expatriates in China
Pakistani cricket coaches